Bereznik, also known as Dvinskoy Bereznik, is an rural locality (a settlement) and the administrative center of Vinogradovsky District of Arkhangelsk Oblast, Russia, located on the left bank of the Northern Dvina River,  southeast of Kholmogorskaya railway station and  from Arkhangelsk. Within the framework of municipal divisions, it serves as the administrative center of Bereznikovskoye Urban Settlement, the only urban settlement in the district. Population:    ~4,000 (1968).

History
During the Russian Civil War, battles between British and American troops and the Bolshevik troops took place on the territory of modern Vinogradovsky District. The battles also involved the Northern Dvina Flotilla, which acted on the Northern Dvina.

On July 15, 1929, the uyezds were abolished and Bereznikovsky District was established. It became a part of Nyandoma Okrug of Northern Krai. In 1940, Bereznikovsky District was renamed Vinogradovsky after Pavlin Vinogradov, a Bolshevik and an active participant in the October Revolution and the Russian Civil War. In 1918, Vinogradov was sent to Arkhangelsk and eventually charged with the organization of the Bolshevik resistance to British and American troops.

On 1 January 2021, Bereznik was transformed to rural settlement. Economy-related legal and tax reasons were cited for this decision.

Economy

Industry
The economy of Bereznik comprises mainly timber industry and food industry. Timber was rafted down the Northern Dvina until the 1990s but since then this practice has been abolished.

Transportation
The Northern Dvina is navigable in Bereznik.

Bereznik is located on one of the principal highways in Russia, M8 connecting Moscow and Arkhangelsk. There are regular bus connections with Arkhangelsk, Velsk, Kotlas, and Kargopol.

Culture and recreation
Vinogradovsky District Museum in Bereznik, open in 1970, is the only museum in the district.

References

Notes

Sources

Rural localities in Vinogradovsky District
Shenkursky Uyezd